Maria Bueno and Billie Jean King were the defending champions, but decided not to play together. King partnered with Rosie Casals but lost in the quarterfinals. Bueno played with Nancy Richey and they defeated Margaret Smith and Judy Tegart in the final, 6–3, 4–6, 6–4 to win the ladies' doubles tennis title at the 1966 Wimbledon Championships.

Seeds

  Margaret Smith /  Judy Tegart (final)
  Maria Bueno /  Nancy Richey (champions)
  Françoise Dürr /  Janine Lieffrig (first round)
  Ann Jones /  Virginia Wade (semifinals)

Draw

Finals

Top half

Section 1

Section 2

Bottom half

Section 3

Section 4

References

External links

Women's Doubles
Wimbledon Championship by year – Women's doubles
Wimbledon Championships
Wimbledon Championships